The sympathetic trunks (sympathetic chain, gangliated cord) are a paired bundle of nerve fibers that run from the base of the skull to the coccyx. They are a major component of the sympathetic nervous system.

Structure
The sympathetic trunk lies just lateral to the vertebral bodies for the entire length of the vertebral column.  It interacts with the anterior rami of  spinal nerves by way of rami communicantes. The sympathetic trunk permits preganglionic fibers of the sympathetic nervous system to ascend to spinal levels superior to T1 and descend to spinal levels inferior to L2/3.
 
The superior end of it is continued upward through the carotid canal into the skull, and forms a plexus on the internal carotid artery; the inferior part travels in front of the coccyx, where it converges with the other trunk at a structure known as the ganglion impar.

Along the length of the sympathetic trunk are sympathetic ganglia known as paravertebral ganglia.

Function
The sympathetic trunk is a fundamental part of the sympathetic nervous system, and part of the autonomic nervous system.  It allows nerve fibres to travel to spinal nerves that are superior and inferior to the one in which they originated.  Also, a number of nerves, such as most of the splanchnic nerves, arise directly from the trunks.

Additional images

See also
 Horner's syndrome

References

External links
  - "The position of the right and left vagus nerves, and sympathetic trunks in the mediastinum."
  - "The Female Pelvis: The Posterolateral Pelvic Wall"
  - "Autonomic Connections of the Spinal Cord"
 Diagram at umm.edu

Sympathetic nervous system